Rogue Squadron is a starfighter squadron in the science fiction saga Star Wars.

Rogue Squadron may also refer to:

In video games:
 Star Wars: Rogue Squadron (series), a video game series, consisting of:
 Star Wars: Rogue Squadron, a 1998 action shooter released for the Nintendo 64 and Microsoft Windows
 Star Wars Rogue Squadron II: Rogue Leader, a sequel released on the Nintendo GameCube in 2001
 Star Wars Rogue Squadron III: Rebel Strike, a sequel released on the Nintendo GameCube in 2003

In literature:
 Rogue Squadron, the first novel in the Star Wars: X-wing novel series by Michael A. Stackpole
 Star Wars: X-wing Rogue Squadron, a series of comic books published by Dark Horse Comics

In film:
 Star Wars: Rogue Squadron, an upcoming film directed by Patty Jenkins

In the real world:
 The 75th Expeditionary Airlift Squadron, a U.S. military unit nicknamed "Rogue Squadron"